Sir Graeme John Davies   (7 April 1937 – 30 August 2022) was a New Zealand engineer, academic and administrator. During his career, he was Vice-Chancellor of three universities: the University of Liverpool, the University of Glasgow and the University of London.

Early life
He was the son of Harry John Davies and Gladys Edna Davies (née Pratt). He was born in New Zealand and attended Mount Albert Grammar School in Auckland. He later attended the University of Auckland when he obtained a BE in Aeronautical Engineering and PhD in Materials Science. His doctoral thesis was entitled The work-hardening behaviour of polycrystalline copper during interrupted tensile testing.

Career
In 1962 Davies moved to the University of Cambridge, and subsequently became a Fellow and Dean of St Catharine's College, Cambridge, obtaining an MA and ScD.

Davies taught metallurgy at the University of Auckland (1964–1966), the University of Cambridge (1966–1977) and the University of Sheffield (1978–1986) where he was Professor of Metallurgy.

Davies served as Chief Executive of the Universities Funding Council (UFC), and also of the Polytechnic and Colleges Funding Council (PCFC), and then of their successor, the Higher Education Funding Council for England (HEFCE). He was also a Fellow of the Royal Academy of Engineering and a Fellow of the Royal Society of Edinburgh and an Honorary Fellow of the Royal Society of New Zealand, the Royal Veterinary College, the UCL School of Pharmacy, Trinity Laban Conservatoire of Music and Dance, St George's, University of London, the Royal College of Physicians and Surgeons of Glasgow and the Chartered Institute of Procurement & Supply. He was awarded Honorary Doctorates by thirteen universities.

Davies became an Honorary Fellow of St Catharine's College, Cambridge in 1989. Davies also served as the Chairman of Universities Superannuation Scheme (USS), Ltd. He also held roles including Emeritus Vice Chancellor of the University of London; Chairman of the British University Vietnam, the Foundation for Liver Research, Governor of the University of Lincoln, of Taylor's University, of the British Institute of Technology and E-commerce, and Trustee of Regent's University London.

Davies was Member of the Council of the Worshipful Company of Ironmongers, and was Master from 2005 to 2006. He was also the Chairman of the NZ-UK Link Foundation and the Council for the Central Laboratory of the Research Councils, and a Governor of the University of Hertfordshire, of the University of Seychelles, and of Shrewsbury School. For five years he served as a Member of the Public Interest Body of Pricewaterhouse Coopers.

Davies was knighted in 1996 New Year Honours for services to the Higher Education Funding Council for England. He died at his home on 30 August 2022, at the age of 85.

Publications

 Solidification and Casting (1973)
 Texture and the Properties of Materials (co-ed, 1976)
 Solidificacao e Fundicao das Metals e Suas Ligas (jtly, 1978)
 Hot Working and Forming Processes (co-ed, 1980)
 Superplasticity (jtly, 1981)
 Essential Metallurgy for Engineers (jtly, 1985)
 Herding Cats (jtly, 2010)

See also
 List of Vice-Chancellors of the University of London

References

External links
Profile of Sir Graeme Davies at the University of London
Profile of Sir Graeme Davies at St Catharine's College, Cambridge
UK Centre for Materials Education: Interview with Professor Sir Graeme Davies

1937 births
2022 deaths
Vice-Chancellors of the University of Liverpool
Alumni of St Catharine's College, Cambridge
University of Auckland alumni
New Zealand academics
New Zealand Knights Bachelor
Principals of the University of Glasgow
Vice-Chancellors of the University of London
Fellows of the Royal Academy of Engineering
Fellows of the Royal Society of New Zealand
New Zealand expatriates in England
21st-century British engineers
20th-century New Zealand engineers
People educated at Mount Albert Grammar School